Gatliff may refer to:

Gatliff, Kentucky, a community in Whitley County, Kentucky
Betty Pat Gatliff (1930–2020), American forensic artist
Frank Gatliff (1927–1990), Australian actor